Basil Cheesman Bunting (1 March 1900 – 17 April 1985) was a British modernist poet whose reputation was established with the publication of Briggflatts in 1966, generally regarded as one of the major achievements of the modernist tradition in English. He had a lifelong interest in music that led him to emphasise the sonic qualities of poetry, particularly the importance of reading poetry aloud: he was an accomplished reader of his own work.

Life and career
Born into a Quaker family in Scotswood-on-Tyne, near Newcastle-on-Tyne, he studied at two Quaker schools: from 1912 to 1916 at Ackworth School in the West Riding of Yorkshire and from 1916 to 1918 at Leighton Park School in Berkshire. His Quaker education strongly influenced his pacifist opposition to the First World War, and in 1918 he was arrested as a conscientious objector having been refused recognition by the tribunals and refusing to comply with a notice of call-up. Handed over to the military, he was court-martialled for refusing to obey orders, and served a sentence of more than a year in Wormwood Scrubs and Winchester prisons. Bunting's friend Louis Zukofsky described him as a "conservative/anti-fascist/imperialist", though Bunting himself listed the major influences on his artistic and personal outlook somewhat differently as "Jails and the sea, Quaker mysticism and socialist politics, a lasting unlucky passion, the slums of Lambeth and Hoxton ..." 
 
These events were to have an important role in his first major poem, "Villon" (1925). "Villon" was one of a rather rare set of complex structured poems that Bunting labelled "sonatas", thus underlining the sonic qualities of his verse and recalling his love of music. Other "sonatas" include "Attis: or, Something Missing", "Aus Dem Zweiten Reich",  "The Well of Lycopolis",  "The Spoils" and, finally, "Briggflatts". After his release from prison in 1919, traumatised by the time spent there, Bunting went to London, where he enrolled in the London School of Economics, and had his first contacts with journalists, social activists and Bohemia. Bunting was introduced to the works of Ezra Pound by Nina Hamnett who lent him a copy of Homage to Sextus Propertius. The glamour of the cosmopolitan modernist examples of Nina Hamnett and Mina Loy seems to have influenced Bunting in his later move from London to Paris.

After travelling in Northern Europe, Bunting left the London School of Economics without a degree and went to France. There, in 1923, he became friendly with Ezra Pound, who years later would dedicate his Guide to Kulchur (1938) to both Bunting and Louis Zukofsky, "strugglers in the desert". Between February and October 1927, Bunting wrote articles and reviews for The Outlook, and then became its music critic until the magazine ceased publication in 1928. Bunting's poetry began to show the influence of the friendship with Pound, whom he visited in Rapallo, Italy, and later settled there with his family from 1931 to 1933. He was published in the Objectivist issue of Poetry magazine, in the Objectivist Anthology, and in Pound's Active Anthology.

In the 1930s, Bunting became interested in medieval Persian literature, studied the language to some degree, and began publishing adaptations of Persian poems by Ferdowsi, Manuchehri, Sa’di, Hafez, and Obayd Zakani; their use of sound patterning seems to have influenced his own. During the Second World War, Bunting served in British Military Intelligence in Persia. After the war, in 1948, he left government service to become the correspondent for The Times of London, in Iran. He married a Kurdish woman, Sima Alladadian, who was thirty years his junior. Because of his marriage to the underage girl, Bunting was fired from the British embassy.

Back in Newcastle, he worked as a journalist on the Evening Chronicle until his rediscovery during the 1960s by young poets, notably Tom Pickard and Jonathan Williams, who were interested in working in the modernist tradition. In 1966, he published his major long poem, Briggflatts, named after the village in Cumbria where he is now buried in the Quaker graveyard.

In later life he published Advice to Young Poets, beginning "I SUGGEST / 1. Compose aloud; poetry is a sound."

Bunting died in 1985 in Hexham, Northumberland.

The Basil Bunting Poetry Award and Young Person's Prize, administered by Newcastle University, are open internationally to any poet writing in English.

Briggflatts

Divided into five parts and noted for its intricate use of sound and resonances with medieval literature, Briggflatts is an autobiographical long poem, looking back on teenage love and on Bunting's involvement in the high modernist period. In addition, Briggflatts can be read as a meditation on the limits of life and a celebration of Northumbrian culture and dialect, as symbolised by events and figures like the doomed Viking King Eric Bloodaxe. The critic Cyril Connolly was among the first to recognise the poem's value, describing it as "the finest long poem to have been published in England since T. S. Eliot's Four Quartets".

Portrait bust of Basil Bunting

Basil Bunting sat in Northumberland for sculptor Alan Thornhill, with a resulting terracotta (for bronze) in existence. The correspondence file relating to the Bunting portrait bust is held as part of the Thornhill Papers (2006:56) in the archive of the Henry Moore Foundation's Henry Moore Institute in Leeds and the terracotta remains in the collection of the artist. The 1973 portrait is displayed in the Burton (2014) biography of Bunting.

In popular culture
Mark Knopfler wrote a song, titled 'Basil', about his time as a Saturday afternoon copy boy on the Newcastle Evening Chronicle when Bunting worked there. The song was recorded for Knopfler's 2015 album Tracker.

Books
 1930: Redimiculum Matellarum (privately printed) 
 1950: Poems (Cleaners' Press, 1950) revised and published as Loquitur (Fulcrum Press, 1965). 
 1951: The Spoils
 1965: First Book of Odes
 1965: Ode II/2
 1966: Briggflatts: An Autobiography
 1967: Two Poems
 1967: What the chairman Told Tom 
 1968: Collected Poems
 1972: Version of Horace
 1991: Uncollected Poems (posthumous, edited by Richard Caddel)
 1994: The Complete Poems (posthumous, edited by Richard Caddel)
 1999: Basil Bunting on Poetry (posthumous, edited by Peter Makin)
 2000: Complete Poems (posthumous, edited by Richard Caddel)
 2009: Briggflatts (with audio CD and video DVD)
 2012: Bunting's Persia (translations by Basil Bunting, edited by Don Share)
 2016: The Poems of Basil Bunting (posthumous, edited, with intro and commentary by Don Share)
 2022: Letters of Basil Bunting (selected and edited by Alex Niven)

References

Notes

Further reading
 Alldritt, Keith, Modernism in the Second World War:The Later Poetry of Ezra Pound, T.S. Eliot, Basil Bunting and Hugh MacDiarmid, New York: Peter Lang, 1989, 
 Alldritt, Keith, The Poet As Spy: The Life and Wild Times of Basil Bunting, London: Aurum Press, 1998, .
 Bunting, Basil, I SUGGEST, Advice to Young Poets, Basil Bunting Poetry Archive, Durham University Library 190 
 Burton, Richard, A Strong Song Tows Us: The Life of Basil Bunting, Oxford: Infinite Ideas, 2013, .
 Makin, Peter (editor) Basil Bunting on Poetry, Johns Hopkins University Press, Baltimore, 1999. .
 Patton, Simon; Azadibougar, Omid (2016). "Basil Bunting's Versions of Manuchehri Damghani". Translation and Literature, Volume 25 Issue 3, Page 339-362, ISSN 0968-1361. (Edinburgh University Press).
 Williams, Jonathan, Descant On Rawthey's Madrigal: Conversations with Basil Bunting, Lexington, KY: Gnomon Press, 1968.

External links 

Basil Bunting Poetry Centre
Basil Bunting's Grave
Basil Bunting Home Page at EPC, Buffalo
At Briggflatts Meetinghouse recording read by the author
Minor Poet, Not Conspicuously Dishonest, Richard Caddel's Introduction to Complete Poems
Review of Complete Poems
Basil Bunting Finding Aid, Miami University Libraries
On Bunting and Apophasis

1900 births
1985 deaths
Objectivist poets
English conscientious objectors
Writers from Newcastle upon Tyne
People educated at Ackworth School
People educated at Leighton Park School
People educated at the Royal Grammar School, Newcastle upon Tyne
Alumni of the London School of Economics
English Christian pacifists
20th-century English poets
Presidents of the Poetry Society